The Arethusa-class cruisers were a class of eight oil-fired light cruisers of the Royal Navy all ordered in September 1912, primarily for service in the North Sea. They had three funnels with the middle one somewhat larger in diameter than the others. All served in the First World War. They were found to be very cramped internally.

Design and description
The earlier scout cruisers were too slow to accomplish their intended duties of working with destroyer flotillas and defending the fleet against attacks by enemy destroyers. In support of this goal, they were the first cruisers to use destroyer-type high-speed steam turbines and oil-fired boilers were chosen to save weight and increase their power to meet the specification. They retained the side protection introduced in the later ships of the previous , but reverted to a mixed main armament that was a feature of the earlier ships of that class.

The six ships that used Parsons turbines were equipped with cruising turbines on the outer shafts, but the two ships that used Brown-Curtis turbines were not so fitted.

The main armament of the Arethusa-class ships was two BL 6-inch (152 mm) Mk XII guns that were mounted on the centreline fore and aft of the superstructure and six QF 4-inch Mk V guns in waist mountings. They were also fitted with a single QF 3-pounder  anti-aircraft gun and four  torpedo tubes in two twin mounts.

Ships 

 , built by Chatham Dockyard, laid down 28 October 1912, launched 25 October 1913, and completed August 1914. She was sunk by mine off Felixstowe on 11 February 1916.
 , built by Devonport Dockyard, laid down 24 October 1912, launched 30 September 1913, and completed September 1914. She took part in the sinking of the German raider  on 9 August 1915, was transferred to the Royal Canadian Navy in November 1920, and for sold for breaking up in August 1927.
 , built by William Beardmore and Company, Dalmuir, laid down 9 January 1913, launched 14 May 1914, and completed December 1914. She also took part in the sinking of the German raider Meteor on 9 August 1915, and was sold for breaking up 25 October 1921.
 , built by Beardmore, laid down 3 April 1913, launched 6 July 1914, and completed January 1915. She was sold for breaking up 9 June 1922.
 , built by Vickers, Barrow in Furness, laid down 1 February 1913, launched 25 August 1914, and completed December 1914. She was damaged by a torpedo from the German submarine UB-29 on 25 April 1916, but repaired, and was sold for breaking up in October 1924.
 , built by Vickers, laid down 12 March 1913, launched 21 October 1914, and completed February 1915. She fought at the Dardanelles in 1915, and was sold for breaking up 16 January 1923.
 , built by Beardmore, laid down 3 June 1913, launched 14 January 1915, and completed March 1915. She was sold for breaking up 24 August 1922.
 , built by Fairfield Shipbuilding and Engineering Company, Govan, laid down 21 December 1912, launched 28 April 1914, and completed August 1914. She took part in the Battle off Texel on 17 October 1914, and was sold for breaking up 9 April 1923.

Galatea, Inconstant, Phaeton and Royalist fought in the battle of Jutland on 31 May 1916.

Notes

Bibliography

External links

WWI British light cruisers

 
Cruiser classes
Ship classes of the Royal Navy